Marco Guglielmi (6 October 1926 – 28 December 2005) was an Italian actor, screenwriter and author.

Life and career 
Born Augusto Guglielmi in Sanremo, he graduated from ragioneria, then he enrolled at the university in the faculty of economics and business, though without finishing his studies. Guglielmi later attended the Centro Sperimentale di Cinematografia in Rome, graduating in 1953, despite having participated in 1951–52 in a few films in minor roles. He then started a busy acting career on stage, television and cinema, even if often cast in supporting and character roles.
 
Guglielmi also worked in fotoromanzi  for the magazine Sogno. He was also active as screenwriter and novelist;  his novel, "Er più de Roma", co-written by Lucio Mandarà, was adapted into the film Il principe fusto, directed by Maurizio Arena and released in 1960.

Selected filmography

 They Were Three Hundred (1952) - L'alfiere
 Nessuno ha tradito (1952)
 Er fattaccio (1952) - Tarmato
 Attila (1954) - Kadis
 The Art of Getting Along (1955) - L'avvocato Giardini
 The Abandoned (1955) - Scattered soldiers' officer
 Folgore Division (1955) - 1st Lieutnant Corsini
 Destinazione Piovarolo (1955)
 Andrea Chenier (1955)
 Una voce, una chitarra, un po' di luna (1956) - Don Pietro
 Dimentica il mio passato (1957)
 Engaged to Death (1957)
 El Alamein (1957) - Tenente Santi
 La canzone del destino (1957) - Cesare Marini
 La canzone più bella (1957)
 Pezzo, capopezzo e capitano (1958) - Alberto
 Adorabili e bugiarde (1958) - Nando
 Maid, Thief and Guard (1958) - Franco
 Vite perdute (1959) - Toni
 Pensione Edelweiss (1959) - Le peintre
 The Black Chapel (1959) - Pater Orlando
 Terror of the Red Mask (1960) - Ivano
 The Savage Innocents (1960) - Missionary
 Il principe fusto (1960)
 Gli avventurieri dei tropici (1960)
 The Night They Killed Rasputin (1960)
 Mill of the Stone Women (1960) - Ralf
 Cavalcata selvaggia (1960)
 The Story of Joseph and His Brethren (1961) - Judah, Joseph's Brother
 Planets Against Us (1962) - Capt. Carboni
 The Carpet of Horror (1962) - Inspector Webster
 Family Diary (1962)
 Seven Seas to Calais (1962) - Fletcher
 Imperial Venus (1962) - Junot
 Tempo di credere (1962)
 Luciano, una vita bruciata (1962)
 Noche de verano (1963) - Enrique
 The Visit (1964) - Police Officer Chesco (uncredited)
 Una sporca guerra (1965)
 Berlino appuntamento per le spie (Operazione Polifemo) (1965) - Kurt
 Secret Agent Super Dragon (1966) - Professor Kurge
 Si muore solo una volta (1967) - John Malsky
 The Looters (1967) - Dietrich
 The Stranger Returns (1967) - The Preacher
 Bandidos (1967) - Kramer
 Anyone Can Play (1968) - Berto, Esmerelda's husband
 Run, Man, Run (1968) - Colonel Michel Sévigny
 The Battle of El Alamein (1969) - Capt. Hubert
 Plagio (1969)
 Probabilità zero (1969) - Captain Kreuz
 Revenge (1969) - Philip
 Un gioco per Eveline (1971) - Phillipe Giraud
 Our Lady of Lust (1972) - Prof. Paolo
 The Godfather's Advisor (1973) - Don Calogero Micheli
 Società a responsabilità molto limitata (1973) - Commissario di polizia
 24 ore... non un minuto di più (1973) - General Perez
 Last Days of Mussolini (1974)
 La minorenne (1974) - Massimo Sanna
 How to Kill a Judge (1975) - State Prosecutor Alberto Traini-Luiz
 Nick the Sting (1976) - Will Leffern (uncredited)
 The Cynic, the Rat and the Fist (1977) - Marchetti
 The Greatest Battle (1978) - Capt. Fitzpatrick
 Candido Erotico (1978) - Paul / Husband
 La guerra sul fronte Est (1981)
 Canto d'amore (1982)
 Un uomo di razza (1989) - Tommasi
 Blu notte (1992) - (final film role)

References

External links 
  
 

1926 births
2005 deaths
Italian male film actors
Italian male television actors
Italian male stage actors
People from Sanremo
20th-century Italian male actors
Centro Sperimentale di Cinematografia alumni